Round collar robe, also called  and  in China,  in Korea, was a style of , a Chinese robe, worn in ancient China, which was long enough to cover the entire body of its wearer. Depending on time period, the Chinese  also had some traces of influences from the  worn by the Sogdian. The Chinese  continued to evolve, developing distinctive Chinese characteristics with time and lost its  connotation. It eventually became fully integrated in the  system for the imperial and court dress attire. Under the influence of ancient China, the Chinese  was adopted by the rest of the East Asian cultural sphere.

History

China 

By the Tang dynasty, the  became a formal attire which was typically worn by men although it also became fashionable for women to wear it in some dynasties, such as in the Tang dynasty.

Korea 
In Korea, round collared hanbok was worn with roots in hobok and Goguryeo murals show that it was worn often as an inner garment. The official court uniform called danryeong was introduced from Tang dynasty by Kim Chun-chu in the second year of Queen Jindeok's rule.  Since then, it has been worn as an official outfit for government officials until the end of Joseon. It originated from the Chinese' round collar robe. At first, the danryeong collar was circular, similar to the Chinese round collar robe but later localized into a uniquely Korean U-shaped collar also seen in the Won-sam. 

Danryeong is used as a type of Gwanbok. Sometimes it is worn together with the dapho.

In late Joseon, under the 1884 decree of King Gojong, only black-coloured danryeong were permitted to be worn by court officials.

Japan

See also 

China: Yuanlingshan; panling lanshan, fanlingpao
Korea: Gwanbok
Japan: Sokutai

References 

History of Asian clothing